Felipe Ariel Flores Quijada (born 20 July 1977) is a Chilean former professional footballer who played as a forward for clubs of Chile, Mexico and Portugal.

Honours
Deportes La Serena
 Primera B de Chile: 1996

External links
 
 
 

1977 births
Living people
People from La Serena
Chilean footballers
Association football forwards
Deportes La Serena footballers
Colo-Colo footballers
Santos Laguna footballers
Santiago Wanderers footballers
Boavista F.C. players
O'Higgins F.C. footballers
Coquimbo Unido footballers
Primera B de Chile players
Chilean Primera División players
Liga MX players
Primeira Liga players
Chilean expatriate footballers
Chilean expatriate sportspeople in Mexico
Expatriate footballers in Mexico
Chilean expatriate sportspeople in Portugal
Expatriate footballers in Portugal